Samba railway station is a small railway station in Samba district, Jammu and Kashmir, India. Its code is SMBX. It serves Samba town. The station consists of 2 platforms.

Electrification
The entire Jalandhar–Jammu section, Jammu Tawi station and sidings have been completely energised at 25 kV AC and approved for electric traction in August 2014. Swaraj Express now gets an end to end WAP-4 from Jammu Tawi to Bandra Terminus. Himgiri Express now gets an end to end WAP-7 from Jammu Tawi to Howrah.

References

Railway stations in Samba district
Firozpur railway division